Alan Eduardo Schons (born 24 May 1993) is a Brazilian footballer.

Honors
Moreirense
Taça da Liga: 2016–17

References

Sportspeople from Rio Grande do Sul
1993 births
Living people
Brazilian footballers
Brazilian expatriate footballers
Primeira Liga players
Esporte Clube Juventude players
Moreirense F.C. players
F.C. Penafiel players
Association football midfielders
Brazilian expatriate sportspeople in Portugal
Expatriate footballers in Portugal